Andrew George "Red" Spooner (August 24, 1910 — May 7, 1984) was a Canadian professional ice hockey goaltender who played in one National Hockey League game for the Pittsburgh Pirates during the 1929–30 NHL season.

Career statistics

Regular season and playoffs

See also
List of players who played only one game in the NHL

References

1910 births
1984 deaths
Canadian ice hockey goaltenders
Ice hockey people from Ontario
Pittsburgh Pirates (NHL) players
Sportspeople from Thunder Bay